A manuscript is a handwritten original or copy of a text or composition.

Manuscript may also refer to:
 Manuscript (publishing)
 Manuscript, typographic style of block letters
 Manuscript, a typeface produced by Grafotechna in the mid 1940s
 Manuscript Society, a senior society at Yale University

Television
 "The Manuscript", an episode of Tales of Wells Fargo
 "The Manuscript", an episode of The Mysterious Cities of Gold
 "The Manuscript", an episode of Lady Chatterley's Stories

Music
 The Manuscript (album), a 2016 album by Dave Hollister
 The Manuscript (My Dying Bride EP), 2013
 The Manuscript (Vic Mensa EP), 2017
 "Manuscript", 2002 single by E-A-Ski
 "Manuscript", song by Al Stewart from 1970 album Zero She Flies

Other uses
 The Manuscript, 1998 novel by Eva Zeller